Zoran Todorović (born July 9, 1967) is a Serbian basketball coach and former player.

Playing career 
Todorović played for Smederevo 1953, Goša from Smederevska Palanka, and Radnički Kovin. He also played in the 1995–96 season for the Apollon Limassol of the Cyprus Division A.

Coaching career 
Todorović started his coaching career in 1999 with Smederevo 1953. In 2001, he had moved to Swisslion Vršac where he stayed until 2003. In 2003, once again he signed with Smederevo. After two seasons he became a youth coach for the FMP. In 2006–07 season he coached Pelister of the Macedonian First League. In next season, he coached Proleter Naftagas of the Second Basketball League of Serbia.

In September 2017, Todorović was named a head coach for Kragujevački Radnički of the Basketball League of Serbia. After four losses in first four games on the start of 2017–18 season, he resigned.

On 6 February 2020, Todorović was named a head coach for Vršac. On 2 November 2020, Vršac parted ways with him.

National youth teams 
Todorović was an assistant coach for the Serbian men's university team in 2012 and 2013.

On 17 December 2015, Todorović was named as the head coach of the Serbia men's B national team. On 8 February 2017, he became the head coach of the Serbian men's university team. His team took 4th place at the 2017 Summer Universiade in Taipei, Taiwan.

References

External links
 Coach Profile at eurobasket.com

1967 births
Living people
KK Smederevo coaches
KK Proleter Zrenjanin coaches
KK Lions/Swisslion Vršac coaches
KK Vršac coaches
KK Mladost SP coaches
KKK Radnički coaches
Sportspeople from Smederevo
Serbian men's basketball coaches
Serbian expatriate basketball people in Cyprus
Serbian expatriate basketball people in North Macedonia
Serbian men's basketball players
Yugoslav men's basketball players
Point guards